Steven D’Hondt is an American geomicrobiologist who studies microbial communities living beneath the seafloor. He is a professor of oceanography at the University of Rhode Island.

Career
D’Hondt earned his BS in Geology at Stanford University in 1984 and his PhD in Geological and Geophysical Sciences at Princeton University in 1990. He became an assistant professor in the Graduate School of Oceanography at the University of Rhode Island in 1989, where he remains today.

D’Hondt’s research program investigates marine microorganisms in subseafloor sediments, with projects looking at the global distribution of cells, the energetics of subseafloor communities, ancient sedimentary DNA, and the acidification of estuaries due to human impact. In a 2009 study, his group examined sediments from below the South Pacific Gyre, an area of ocean between Australia and South America where little organic matter falls to the seafloor. They discovered very low numbers of microbial cells and the presence of oxygen several meters down. Sediments with greater numbers of microbes lack oxygen at these depths. In a 2015 study, D’Hondt led a research group that demonstrated that oxygen penetrates the entire sediment column in as much as one third of the world’s oceans. This oxygen likely affects microbial metabolism in these sediments and may be transported into the underlying mantle.

D’Hondt led the Subsurface Biospheres team of the NASA Astrobiology Institute from 2001 to 2006. He also has been involved with the international scientific drilling community. He was co-chief scientist of the Ocean Drilling Program Leg 201 and the Integrated Ocean Drilling Program Expedition 329, the first and second ocean drilling expeditions to focus primarily on life beneath the seafloor. D’Hondt is a member of the Deep Life Scientific Steering Committee for the Deep Carbon Observatory and a member of the American Geophysical Union, Geochemical Society and Society for Applied Microbiology.

Personal life
D'Hondt is the husband of Rhode Island Secretary of State Nellie Gorbea.

Selected publications
D'Hondt has 75 publications with over 6,000 citations and an h-index of 42. Among the more highly cited are:

See also 
Deep biosphere

References

External links 
 Oceanographer reveals link between subseafloor life and global climate: Todd Mcleish in Phys.org

Living people
American marine biologists
University of Rhode Island faculty
Princeton University alumni
Stanford University alumni
Geomicrobiologists
American ecologists
Year of birth missing (living people)
20th-century American biologists
21st-century American biologists